Nunezia is a subgenus of the mosquito genus Wyeomyia.  It was named to honor the Venezuelan entomologist Manuel Núñez Tovar.

The type species is Wyeomyia bicornis (Root, 1928).  The subgenus includes the species bicornis (Root), lateralis Petrocchi, and paucartamboensis Porter.

References

Culicinae
Insect subgenera